The 1956 German motorcycle Grand Prix was the fourth round of the 1956 Grand Prix motorcycle racing season. It took place on 21–22 July 1956 at the Solitude circuit.

500 cc classification

350 cc classification

250 cc classification

125 cc classification

Sidecar classification

References

German motorcycle Grand Prix
German
German Motorcycle Grand Prix